Francis Asbury Hendry (November 19, 1833 – February 12, 1917) was a Florida cattle rancher, politician, and officer in the Confederate States Army during the American Civil War. He was known by the nickname "Berry."

Early life
Asbury was born near Thomasville, Georgia, a son of James Edward Hendry and Lydia Carlton. In 1851, his father took the family to Hillsborough County, Florida, settling on the Alafia River about twenty-two miles east of Tampa. His father then returned to Georgia to settle his affairs, and died suddenly on January 3, 1852.  Nineteen-year-old Berry, his mother, and his siblings decided to remain in Florida.

On March 25, 1852, Berry married Ardeline Ross Lanier (May 10, 1835 – September 6, 1917), a native of Bulloch County, Georgia.  Soon thereafter, they moved to Fort Meade, Florida, where they started a cattle ranch.  They marked their cattle with a crop and split in one ear and an upper square in the other.  They also branded them with a large "A", Berry's middle initial, as well as his wife's first initial.

The Hendrys lived with the garrison at Fort Meade for a time before building their first home about two miles (3 km) north on a branch of the Peace River, now known as the Berry Hendry Branch.

Military career
During the Third Seminole War, Berry served with both Capt. William B. Hooker and Capt. Leroy G. Lesley in their independent companies of mounted volunteers.  Muster rolls describe him as standing six feet and one inch in height, with grey eyes, and dark hair and complexion. Berry survived the war having seen little or no action.

In 1860, on the eve of the Civil War, Berry Hendry was a cattle rancher who became prosperous from the free labor of eight enslaved Americans he kept indentured on his ranch.  He opposed secession after the election of Abraham Lincoln, but  supported his adopted state after it passed a secession ordinance.

On February 1, 1861, before the war really began in earnest, Hendry led efforts to create Polk County, Florida, and was elected to its first Board of County Commissioners. Hendry spent the first three years of the war supplying cattle to the Confederate Commissary Department.  But, his work was made difficult by a Federal garrison that occupied old Fort Meade as well as Fort Myers.  So, in 1863, he organized his own cavalry company to keep protect cattle intended for the Confederate army. He was given the rank of captain and attached to Colonel C. J. Munnerlyn's Cow Cavalry.

Political career and later life
On October 27, 1857, he was elected to a two-year term on the Hillsborough County Commission.

After Florida surrendered to Federal occupation in the spring of 1865, Hendry represented Polk County at the Second Constitutional Convention in Tallahassee.  He was also elected to the Florida Senate representing the 28th district in the sessions of 1865 and 1866, and the 24th district in the sessions of 1875 and 1877. He was elected to the Florida House of Representatives representing Lee County for the sessions of 1893, 1895, 1897, 1899, 1901, and 1903.

After the Reconstruction government was installed in Tallahassee in 1868, former Confederate officers were not welcome to hold elective office on the state level.  So, Berry Hendry returned to Polk County, and was appointed to serve on the Board of Public Instruction.

During the Reconstruction Era, Hendry continued to build and improve his cattle empire. He made his new headquarters in the abandoned officers' barracks at Fort Myers, and made contact with buyers from Cuba. He was among the first Florida ranchers to ship cattle to that country through the port of Punta Rassa.

On August 12, 1885, Hendry chaired a public meeting held at the schoolhouse in Fort Myers at the corner of Second and Lee Streets. Electors voted to incorporate the town, and Hendry became one of its first councilmen. As a councilman, he led efforts to create Lee County, Florida in 1887, and was elected to its first Board of County Commissioners.

By 1888, Hendry had moved his ranching headquarters to the vicinity of Fort Thompson.  He also began to dispose of much of his range cattle in favor of Jersey and other breeds in an effort to improve the quality of his stock.  He acquired large tracts of marshland along the Caloosahatchee River for grazing. In 1893, Major Hendry was elected to represent Lee County in the state legislature, and served for more than a decade. In 1895, he platted the town of LaBelle, Florida, which he named for his daughters Laura and Belle Hendry.

During his last years, Major Hendry retired to Fort Myers for better access to medical care.  He suffered from chronic nephritis, a kidney disease. 
He was awarded a monthly pension of twenty dollars by the State of Florida.

Death and legacy
Hendry died at Fort Myers.  On May 11, 1923, the state legislature honored him with the creation of Hendry County, Florida, designating LaBelle as its seat of government.

References

1833 births
1917 deaths
American people of the Seminole Wars
Confederate States Army officers
County commissioners in Florida
Florida city council members
Florida state senators
Florida pioneers
Hendry County, Florida
Members of the Florida House of Representatives
People from Thomasville, Georgia
People from Hillsborough County, Florida
People from Fort Myers, Florida
People from Fort Meade, Florida
19th-century American politicians